Kathleen Alcalá (born 29 August 1954) is the author of a short-story collection, three novels set in the American Southwest and nineteenth-century Mexico, and a collection of essays.  She teaches creative writing at workshops and programs in Washington state and elsewhere, including Seattle University, the University of New Mexico and Richard Hugo House.

Career
Alcalá is also a co-founder of and contributing editor to The Raven Chronicles.  A play based on her novel, Spirits of the Ordinary, was produced by The Miracle Theatre of Portland, Oregon.  She served on the board of Richard Hugo House and the advisory boards of Con Tinta, Field’s End and the Centrum Writers Conference. She is the winner of several awards for her writing, including an Artist Trust/Washington State Arts Commission Fellowship in 2007.
 
Alcalá resides on Bainbridge Island, Washington.

Works
Mrs. Vargas and the Dead Naturalist (Calyx Books)
Spirits of the Ordinary (Chronicle; Harvest Books)
The Flower in the Skull (Chronicle; Harvest Books)
Treasures in Heaven (Chronicle; Northwestern University Press)
The Desert Remembers My Name: On Family and Writing (University of Arizona Press)
The Deepest Roots: Finding Food and Community on a Pacific Northwest Island

Bibliographical Resources
https://faculty.ucmerced.edu/mmartin-rodriguez/index_files/vhAlcalaKathleen.htm

Critical reception
Charles de Lint, reviewing The Flower in the Skull, declared that "Alcalá is fast becoming one of my favourite writers," praising her work for the "richness [of her] characterization and settings."

References

External links
Kathleen Alcalá's homepage

1954 births
Living people
American historical novelists
American women novelists
American women short story writers
American writers of Mexican descent
Women science fiction and fantasy writers
Hispanic and Latino American novelists
Writers from Bainbridge Island, Washington
20th-century American novelists
21st-century American novelists
20th-century American women writers
21st-century American women writers
Women historical novelists
20th-century American short story writers
21st-century American short story writers
Novelists from Washington (state)